A Severed Head is a 1970 British comedy-drama film directed by Dick Clement, and starring Claire Bloom, Lee Remick, Richard Attenborough, and Ian Holm. It is based on the 1961 novel of the same name by Iris Murdoch.

Opening credits
The highly unique credits features accurate dolls of each cast member in turn, rotating against a black background.

Plot
The story is set in and around London.

Antonia is the pampered wife of an upper class wine merchant Martin Lynch-Gibbon. She tells her husband that she is in love with their best friend psychiatrist Palmer Anderson. Palmer and Antonia wish to deal with the situation in a civilized manner by remaining friends with Martin.

Meanwhile, Martin tries to keep his mistress, Georgie Hands, a secret.

Palmer's sister Honor Klein is met at a railway station by Martin instead of Palmer. Honor, who once taught Georgie at Oxford University, tells Palmer and Antonia about the affair between her former student and Martin. Honor then introduces Georgie to Martin's womanizing brother Alexander. This is just the start of the various liaisons.

Martin visits his sculptor brother Alexander who lives in a large suburban villa.

Georgie works with historic looms in the Royal College of Art in a room overlooking the Albert Memorial.

Martin, Antonia, Palmer and Georgie go for a posh meal together. Georgie can't stand the arrangement and runs off. Martin goes home, and Honor is at the dinner table eating fruit. She has an unsheathed samurai sword. She demonstrates her skill with the sword.

Martin finds Alexander and Georgie together in her college studio and gets annoyed. When Alexander leaves, he proposes to Georgie. When he goes home, Antonio and Antonia are in his bed. They have a casual conversation.

Cast
 Lee Remick - Antonia (Tony) Lynch-Gibbon 
 Richard Attenborough - Palmer Anderson 
 Ian Holm - Martin Lynch-Gibbon 
 Claire Bloom - Honor Klein
 Jennie Linden - Georgie Hands 
 Clive Revill - Alexander Lynch-Gibbon 
 Ann Firbank - Rosemary Lynch-Gibbon 
 Rosamund Greenwood - Miss Seelhaft 
 Constance Lorne - Miss Hernshaw
 Nerys Hughes - nurse

References

External links
 

1970 films
1970 drama films
British drama films
Columbia Pictures films
Films based on British novels
Films scored by Stanley Myers
Films directed by Dick Clement
Films produced by Elliott Kastner
1970s English-language films
1970s British films